Holburn Stadium, also known as Aberdeen Greyhound Stadium, was a greyhound racing stadium in Aberdeen, Scotland. It is not to be confused with the Aberdeen Regent Park Greyhound Stadium.

History

The stadium was located on the south west side of Aberdeen and on the north side of the Bridge of Dee. The owners Aberdeen Stadium Ltd affiliated the track to the National Greyhound Racing Society with the first racing taking place on 7 June 1933. On opening night proceedings were started by the pipes and drums and brass band of the 4th Battalion of the Gordon Highlanders and the opening speech was made by Col. A.H. Farquharson of Invercauld. An attendance of 5,000 saw a greyhound called Rimutaka win the first race at the new stadium.

It was described as a handy little track with very sharp bends and short straights and not the ideal circuit for large greyhounds. It had an Inside Sumner hare and the principal event was the Aberdeen Journals Cup. All of the greyhounds running at the track were owned by the company and kennelled in the 150 track kennels. The circumference of the track was 344 yards.

There was a buffet bar and three licensed bars on site and racing took place on Wednesday & Saturday evenings at 7.30pm. John Jolliffe arrived from Dundee Greyhound Stadium as Racing Manager in 1935 and stayed until 1936 before he moved to Cardiff Arms Park and then Wembley. A totalisator system was installed during the latter part of 1943, under the 1934 Betting and Lotteries Act.

Closure
The last meeting was held on 4 October 1969 before the stadium was converted into a supermarket and warehouses. The closure was sudden with the public, staff and trainers only being informed of the closure several weeks previous.

Track records

References

Defunct greyhound racing venues in the United Kingdom
Sports venues in Aberdeen
Greyhound racing in Scotland